Nowina may refer to:
 the Nowina coat of arms
Nowina, Lower Silesian Voivodeship (south-west Poland)
Nowina, Czarnków-Trzcianka County in Greater Poland Voivodeship (west-central Poland)
Nowina, Piła County in Greater Poland Voivodeship (west-central Poland)
Nowina, Szamotuły County in Greater Poland Voivodeship (west-central Poland)
Nowina, Pomeranian Voivodeship (north Poland)
Nowina, Warmian-Masurian Voivodeship (north Poland)